Pasinetti is a surname. Notable people with the surname include:

 Andrea Pasinetti, American executive
 Antonio Pasinetti (1863–1940), Italian painter
 Francesco Pasinetti (1911–1949), Italian film director and screenwriter
 Giulio Maria Pasinetti, Italian expatriate neurologist
 Luigi Pasinetti (1930–2023), Italian economist
 P. M. Pasinetti (1913–2006), Italian expatriate novelist, professor and journalist
 Pamela Pasinetti (born 1993), Thai-Italian model and beauty pageant titleholder

Italian-language surnames